Avenue is a  tall skyscraper in Charlotte, North Carolina. It was completed in 2007 and has 36 floors. Its construction began on May 17, 2005. It has  of retail space at street level. The  site was originally proposed 201 North Tryon Residential Tower.

See also
List of tallest buildings in Charlotte
List of tallest buildings in North Carolina

References

Emporis
Official Site
The Avenue Video Tour

Residential skyscrapers in Charlotte, North Carolina
Residential buildings completed in 2007
2007 establishments in North Carolina